The 2014 Gujinggong Liquor Haikou World Open was a professional ranking snooker tournament that took place between 10 and 16 March 2014 at the Hainan International Exhibition Center in Haikou, China. It was the ninth ranking event of the 2013/2014 season.

Mark Allen was the defending champion, but he lost 4–6 against Shaun Murphy in the semi-final.

Murphy won his fifth ranking title by defeating Mark Selby 10–6 in the final.

Prize fund
The total prize money of the event was raised to £478,000 from the previous year's £425,000. The breakdown of prize money for this year is shown below:

Winner: £85,000
Runner-up: £35,000
Semi-final: £21,000
Quarter-final: £12,500
Last 16: £8,000
Last 32: £6,500
Last 64: £3,000

Non-televised highest break: £0
Televised highest break: £2,000
Total: £478,000

Wildcard round
These matches were played in Haikou on 10 March 2014.

Main draw

Final

Qualifying
These matches were played on 13 and 14 December 2013 at the Barnsley Metrodome in Barnsley, England. All matches were best of 9 frames.

Century breaks

Qualifying stage centuries

 141  Tom Ford
 137  Marco Fu
 135  Ding Junhui
 131  Tian Pengfei
 125  Stuart Bingham
 119  Luca Brecel
 117  Ryan Day
 116  Liam Highfield
 115  David Gilbert
 112  Joel Walker
 107, 104  Xiao Guodong
 107  Jamie Cope
 106  Dechawat Poomjaeng
 105, 105  Matthew Stevens
 105  Kurt Maflin
 105  Neil Robertson
 104  Graeme Dott
 102  David Morris

Televised stage centuries

 144  Anthony McGill
 136, 128  Ding Junhui
 135, 131, 123  Mark Selby
 134, 127  Thepchaiya Un-Nooh
 129, 110  Kurt Maflin
 128, 126, 112, 105  Shaun Murphy
 127, 121, 114, 104, 104, 104  Marco Fu
 127, 119, 111, 100  Mark Allen
 127, 116, 111, 100  Neil Robertson
 124, 122, 104  John Higgins
 117, 104  Michael Holt
 113  Tian Pengfei
 112  Martin Gould
 112  Ricky Walden
 111  Stephen Maguire
 111  Liang Wenbo
 110, 100  Judd Trump
 108  Mark Joyce
 103  Stuart Bingham
 101  Alan McManus

References

External links
 2014 Haikou World Open – Pictures by Tai Chengzhe at Facebook

2014
World Open
World Open (snooker)
World Open (snooker)
Snooker competitions in China
Haikou